Moetoetoetabriki is a village in Boven Saramacca resort in Sipaliwini District in Suriname. The village is inhabited by Matawai people.

Nearby towns and villages include Heidoti (2.0 nm), Kwattahede (1.4 nm), Pakka-Pakka (13.9 nm),
Makajapingo (7.0 nm) and Tabrikiekondre (4.1 nm).

References

Matawai settlements
Populated places in Sipaliwini District